is a passenger railway station  located in the city of Itami, Hyōgo Prefecture, Japan. It is operated by the West Japan Railway Company (JR West).

Lines

Station layout
The station consists of one ground-level island platform and one side platform, connected by an elevated station building. There are three depot tracks on the west side of the platform, which are used to store trains arriving at and departing from Amagasaki Station at night. The storage track extends further south (towards Amagasaki Station) along the main line, and the maintenance vehicles are stored there.. The station has a Midori no Madoguchi staffed ticket office.

Platforms

Adjacent stations

History
Tsukaguchi Station opened on 6 March 1894 on the Settsu Railway (which merged into Hankaku Railway in 1897, was nationalized as part of Japanese National Railways in 1907, and was renamed from the Hankaku Line to the Fukuchiyama Line in 1912). The JNR Amagasakiko Line was discontinued on 1 February 1984. With the privatization of the Japan National Railways (JNR) on 1 April 1987, the station came under the aegis of the West Japan Railway Company.

Station numbering was introduced in March 2018 with Tsukaguchi being assigned station number JR-G50.

Past line

Passenger statistics
In fiscal 2016, the station was used by an average of 9986 passengers daily

Surrounding area
Million Town Tsukaguchi
Mitsubishi Electric Itami Works
Kamisakabenishi Park
Amagasaki Urban Botanical Garden

See also
List of railway stations in Japan
Tsukaguchi Station (Hankyu)

References

External links 

  Tsukaguchi Station from JR-Odekake.net 

Railway stations in Hyōgo Prefecture
Railway stations in Japan opened in 1894
Amagasaki